Cephrenes augiades, the orange palm dart, is a butterfly of the family Hesperiidae. It is found from Indonesia to the Solomons.

The wingspan is about 40 mm.

Food
The larvae of subspecies sperthias feed on Archontophoenix, Livistona and Phoenix species. During the day it hides within a shelter made by using silk to join fronds of its host plant, which fold together and bend across each other naturally.

Other recorded food plants include:
 
  Acoelorrhaphe wrightii
  Aiphanes corallina
  Bentinckia nicobarica
  Butia eriospatha
  Calamus moti
  Carpentaria acuminata
  Carpoxylon macrospermum
  Chamaedorea microspadix
  Chrysalidocarpus cabadae
  Clinostigma samoense
  Crysophila guagara
  Gaussia attenuata
  Gronophyllum microcarpum
  Gulubia macrospadix
  Heterospathe delicatula
  Heterospathe woodfordiana
  Howea belmoreana
  Livistona merrillii
  Oenocarpus
  Phoenix loureirii
  Pinanga bataanensis
  Pinanga coronata
  Pinanga kuhlii
  Pinanga merrillii
  Pritchardia beccariana
  Pritchardia maideniana
  Pritchardia minor
  Ptychosperma bleeseri
  Ptychosperma furcatum
  Ptychosperma lauterbachii
  Ptychosperma lineare
  Ptychosperma salomonense
  Ptychosperma sanderianum
  Ravenea rivularis
  Rhapis excelsa
  Rhopalostylis baueri
  Rhopalostylis sapida
  Roystonea venezuelana
  Sabal mauritiiformis
  Sabal mexicana
  Sabal parvifolia
  Sabal umbraculifera
  Sabal uresana
  Satakentia liukiuensis
  Scheelea butyracea
  Scheelea cephalotes
  Scheelea zonensis
  Syagrus amara
  Syagrus comosa
  Thrinax excelsa
  Trachycarpus martianus
  Trachycarpus wagneranus
  Veitchia merrillii 
  Verschaffeltia splendida

Subspecies
Cephrenes augiades augiades
Cephrenes augiades sperthias (C. Felder, 1862) (south-eastern coast of New South Wales and the northern Gulf and north-eastern coast of Queensland)
Cephrenes augiades tara Evans, 1935 (Batchian)
Cephrenes augiades arua Evans, 1935 (Papua)
Cephrenes augiades bruno Evans, 1935 (Papua)
Cephrenes augiades burua Evans, 1935 (Buru)
Cephrenes augiades meeki Evans, 1935 (Papua)
Cephrenes augiades tenimbra Evans, 1935
Cephrenes augiades websteri Evans, 1935 (New Britain)

External links
Australian Faunal Directory
Australian Insects

Taractrocerini
Butterflies described in 1860